"En el Cine" (English: At the Cinema) is the first episode of the seventh season of the Mexican sitcom El Chavo del Ocho, which aired originally on Televisa on January 29, 1979. was written and directed by creator Roberto Gomez Bolaños. In the episode, everyone in the vecindad goes to the movies, but they end up causing a commotion there. This is the first episode without Carlos Villagrán in the cast, as he left the series after the sixth season.

Plot 
Don Ramon is very worried as the night comes and he can't find La Chilindrina anywhere. Doña Clotilde appears and tries to comfort him, but makes him more nervous saying that something serious might have occurred. She hugs Don Ramon just as Chilindrina and El Chavo walk in on them. Chilindrina explains that they went to the movies invited by Doña Florinda, who tells that her son Quico went to live with his rich godmother to receive a better education. The following day, Doña Clotilde invites Don Ramon and Chilindrina to the movies. So does Professor Jirafales with Dona Florinda, leaving El Chavo alone in the vecindad. Señor Barriga arrives to collect the rents, but decides to go the movies as well when El Chavo tells him everyone went out. Señor Barriga stops, and realizing that Chavo is alone, invites him to the movies, to which the boy happily accepts. Upon arriving at the cinema, several seat exchanges in the dark begin between Chilindrina, Chavo, Don Ramon and Professor Jirafales, annoying the other moviegoers. When they finally find their seats, Chavo blocks Chilidrina's view, causing her to push him onto Señor Barriga. After another brief moment of peace, El Chavo repeatedly says that they should've gone watch El Chanfle, causing a big discussion between the main cast and complaints from everyone else. The next day, Don Ramon takes Chilindrina and Chavo again to the movies to watch El Chanfle.

Production 
After Carlos Villagrán left the series to star a TV show of his own, Chespirito decided that the best motive to write Quico off would be to say that he moved away. Villagrán's farewell was marked in the late of 1977, however he remained in the cast until the end of the sixth season in 1978. To this day, the real reasons for the actor's departure are discussed. Some of the most famous reasons are that Villagrán and Bolaños allegedly fought over the copyrights of the former's character, Quico. Or probably both actors had a healthy farewell and no grudges towards one another as Villagrán had been invited to star in five shows in Venezuela, something that later was followed by the departure of Ramón Valdés from the cast of El Chavo del Ocho as well.

In the Brazilian dub, El Chavo repeatedly says: "Teria sido melhor ir ver o Pelé" (English: "It would've been better to see [the] Pelé [movie]"). The line has become very popular in Brazil, and has become a part of popular culture in there. In the original Spanish version, he says: "Hubiéramos ido a ver El Chanfle" ("We should’ve gone to watch (the movie) El Chanfle"), to everyone’s annoyance.

The movie the cast goes to watch is Bolaños' creation, El Chanfle. Unlike most of the episodes of the series, En el Cine has not been remade.

Cast 
 Roberto Bolaños as El Chavo
 María Antonieta de las Nieves as Chilindrina
 Florinda Meza as Doña Florinda
 Ruben Aguirre as Professor Jirafales
 Angelines Fernández as Doña Clotilde
 Edgar Vivar as Señor Barriga
 Ramón Valdez as Don Ramón

References 

El Chavo del Ocho
Mexican television sitcoms
1979 in Mexican television
Works set in movie theatres